The MG6 is a compact car which has been produced by Chinese manufacturer SAIC Motor under the MG marque since 2010. It is slotted slightly above the compact sedan MG GT, and the compact hatchback MG 5.

First generation

The first-generation MG6 was initially announced in April 2009 at the Shanghai Auto Show, as a five-door GT/fastback, and in October 2010 at Shanghai Expo, as a four-door notchback saloon model. It is derived from the Roewe 550, hence being distantly related to the Rover 75, sharing its front subframe.

The five-door fastback/hatchback, known as the MG6 GT, went on sale in the United Kingdom in May 2011, the saloon, known as the MG6 Magnette, went on sale on 16 July 2011. A diesel model joined the range at the end of 2012. The first Thai assembled car rolled off the assembly line on 4 June 2014, with a potential for 5,000 cars per annum.

The MG6 sold below expectations in the United Kingdom, eventually being dropped from the range there in 2016, whilst continuing in other markets.

History
Like the Roewe 550, some of the development and styling of the MG6 was done at the SAIC UK Technical Centre although the main design and development contract was given to EDAG: Shanghai. It was originally designed as a Roewe badged model (IP22 Project) but, as SAIC took control of Nanjing Auto, owners of the MG brand, the nearly finished vehicle went through a facelift and came out as the first Chinese MG car.

The MG6 commenced production in China in 2010, and for a brief period in partially knock down form at Longbridge, United Kingdom, from 13 April 2011. Since 2013, the MG 3 supermini also undergoes some limited final assembly at the same factory until 2016.

Following the hatchback 6 GT, the notchback saloon version debuted in June 2011, carrying the Magnette name, which was used by MG during the 1950s to 1960s for its saloon cars, and also in the 1930s for the MG K-type. The MG6 Magnette is quite different from the MG6 GT GT/fastback, as it has a boot rather than a hatchback.

Models

In the United Kingdom, the car was initially launched as the MG6, but on release to the public in May 2011 as the fastback model, was announced as the MG6 GT. For the MG6 GT, three levels of trim are available with increasing levels of equipment and trim: S, SE and TSE.

These all share the same mechanical specification, although the TSE gains 18" wheels over the standard 17".

All models are equipped with a five-speed manual transmission, front MacPherson strut suspension and multi-link rear suspension. The 1.8 L turbo can accelerate to 60 mph in 8.4 seconds, has an official combined fuel consumption of 35.6 mpg and a  figure of 184 g/km.

Minor improvements to the MG6 in April 2012 resulted in fuel economy figure of 37.7 mpg (official combined) and reducing  down to 174 g/km.

The diesel engine is mated to a six-speed manual gearbox, and the steering has changed to an electro hydraulic-powered system.

Due to the introduction and the success of the MG6 in the British Touring Car Championship, MG announced a special edition for the United Kingdom, this being the MG6 BTCC Special Edition. The BTCC Special Edition was based on the SE model.

It came with a matt black roof (vinyl wrap), matt black 18-inch MG6 TSE alloy wheels, black-gloss sills, black-gloss door mirror covers, black-gloss lower-front air dam and rear spoiler. The front grille has a BTCC badge and a distinctive multi-coloured MG KX Momentum Racing team decal is on the bonnet extension panel above the front grille, on the fastback boot lid and on the front doors and wings just behind the chrome wing vent.

The BTCC Special Edition was only available in union blue or arctic white. BTCC Edition graphics are also highlighted on the sills and also inside the car on the passenger facia. In July 2014, the diesel engine was updated, reducing its  emissions to 129 g/km. The MG6 was facelifted for April 2015, receiving a range of exterior and interior changes including a  reduction in weight. It was unveiled at the Chengdu Motor Show in August 2014.

In the United Kingdom, the main mechanical changes comprised an improvement in efficiency for the diesel model, and the withdrawal of the petrol version. The facelifted model can be identified by its new lights and bumpers, front and rear, and a substantially updated interior, including a new console and electronic parking brake. Models in other markets retained two versions of the 1.8-litre petrol engine.

Awards
The MG6 won the What Car? 2012 Security Award. In the Auto Express Driver Power Survey in 2014, it won the Best Handling Award, and came sixth overall in the 'Best Car to Own' category. In 2016, the MG6 won three awards, these being.
Auto Express Driver Power: Best Family Car Bronze Winner
Auto Express Driver Power Road Handling: Silver Winner 
The Caravan Club Tow Car of the Year: Class Winner under £17,500.

Engines
The engines available in the United Kingdom for the MG6 were:

The engines available in China and Thailand for the New MG6 are:

Safety

Sales
Initial sales in 2011 of the MG6 were slow in the United Kingdom, with only fifteen units in October 2011, only seven registrations for the MG brand as a whole were recorded in November (of which three were presumably TF roadsters). Some cited lack of advertising and low perceived quality as problematic, while the absence of a diesel and an estate option were also mooted.

In December 2011, car rental company Avis UK Ltd announced that it would be running one hundred MG6 GT and Magnette in its rental fleet, and took delivery of these cars. For 2012, MG sold 782 cars in the United Kingdom. Initial production was projected in the range of 2,000 to 3,000 per annum, although these volumes were never achieved, and in 2016, MG Motor UK withdrew the MG6 from sale in the United Kingdom.

Reviews
The AA Likes: Sharp handling and good ride, high standard specification, great value for money, good space efficiency.Gripes: Noisy engine when extended, some low-quality cabin materials, no automatic option.
Autocar 'The MG6 is now a greener proposition than ever before, but its bland cabin aesthetics are still letting the side down.'
Auto Express For: Involving handling, performance, standard kit levels.Against: Limited engine choice, poor quality interior, awkward looks.
Auto Trader 'Despite Chinese ownership, the MG 6 is designed and built at Longbridge to take on family [cars]. It's a decent drive, with sharp handling, and there's loads of interior space. Some serious flaws, though.'
Evo  [+] One of the best in its class to drive, well priced.[-] Don't expect premium feel at these prices, gutless [petrol] engine and low-rent cabin.
MSN Cars Positives: ride and handling, equipment, practicality, styling and price.Negatives: interior plastics [and] economy.

Second generation

In November 2016, the second generation was unveiled at Nanjing Wanchi race track. The second-generation MG6 incorporates MG's new design language, "Emotional Dynamism", which was launched with MG's second SUV, the MG ZS in 2016. The new grille which is an important part of MG's new design language is called 'Star Rider'.

The MG6 shares a platform with the sedan Roewe i6, and just like the Roewe ei6, an eMG6 plug-in hybrid version is also available.

MG showed off a  concept as the MG6 XPower at the Shanghai Motor Show in 2019, bringing back the sports sub-brand from the early 2000s. The company said the car would retail at €100,000 if there was sufficient interest.

eMG6 PHEV
The eMG6 PHEV is the plug-in hybrid version of the second-generation MG6. The hybrid system of the eMG6 PHEV is supported by a 9.1 kWh IP67-rated battery and meets the UL2580 standard of United States.

2020 facelift
In July 2020, the second-generation MG6 received a facelift marketed as the third-generation MG6 by SAIC MG. While marketed as a super wide-body sedan, the width is actually the same as the pre-facelift model with the redesigned front and rear end resulted in a  length growth instead. In terms of transmission, MG6 facelift is equipped with a 7-speed wet dual-clutch gearbox and 6-speed manual transmission. The 2020 MG6 was launched in China on 10 July.

MG6 X-Power

The MG6 X-Power is the performance variant of the MG6. On 18 July 2021, MG declared the price of the X-Power variant to be 199,980 yuan (about US$30,000) in China. Consumers can pay 9.9 yuan to preorder the vehicle, and production is limited to 100 per month. The  acceleration time is 6 seconds, according to MG.

2021 facelift (MG6 Pro)
The MG6 received another facelift for the 2021 model year called the MG6 Pro. The MG6 Pro started presales in July 2021. Design wise, the MG6 Pro features a redesigned front end with slimmer headlamps and a larger grille in the same style as the second generation MG 5. Gearbox is a 7-speed, wet-style, dual-clutch transmission.

Motorsport

In January 2012, MG Motor announced that it would enter the 2012 British Touring Car Championship. Triple 8 Race Engineering ran a pair of works MG6 GT models through the MG KX Momentum Racing team, driven by Jason Plato and Andy Neate. Plato ended the season in third place, with the car yet to find its foot in wet conditions.

The team returned in 2013 with Sam Tordoff replacing Neate in the second MG, who performed well in his debut year having joined through the KX Academy scheme. Plato once again came third, with Tordoff sixth. In 2014, MG won the Manufacturers' Championship to break Honda's four-year reign. After just three years of competition, the MG6 GT sealed the title by 95 points at the season finale at Brands Hatch.

Drivers Plato and Tordoff racked up seven wins and twenty podiums in the thirty-race calendar, as Plato finished second in the Drivers' Championship behind Colin Turkington, while Tordoff finished seventh. The season of 2014 also saw a third Triple Eight maintained MG6 GT on the grid, driven by Marc Hynes, who finished his début season in 18th.

For the campaign of 2015, MG returned with a new driver line-up of champion of 2013, Andrew Jordan and Jack Goff; both drivers left prior to the 2016 season. On 8 March 2016, Triple Eight Racing confirmed that Josh Cook and Ashley Sutton would drive for the team in the 2016 British Touring Car Championship.

MG6 BTCC drivers to date have been:

A concept for a new TCR spec MG6 was announced on 14 April 2019. Two new MG6 X-Power TCR cars debuted in the 2019 TCR China round at Zhejiang International Circuit in the third round driven by Rodolfo Avila and Zhendong Zhang as invitation entries.

The cars took third and fourth places at Ningbo International Circuit. The car was officially homologated to compete in the inaugural FIA Motorsport Games Touring Car Cup on 1–3 November, the British team car run by AmDTuning.Com driven by Rory Butcher and the Chinese by MG Motor driven by Zhang, with Butcher finishing a best fourth in race 2. Two cars will compete in the 2020 TCR Asia Series with Team MG X-Power monitoring the WTCR with hopes of entering the car in the championship.

Sales

References

External links

  (Philippines)
  

6
Cars introduced in 2009
2010s cars
Cars of China
Compact cars
Hatchbacks
Sports sedans
Touring cars
ANCAP small family cars
Euro NCAP small family cars
Front-wheel-drive vehicles